Renuka Sharma (1939 – 5 May 2021) was a director who worked in Kannada cinema. He was known for his mythological and historical films. He debuted as director with the film Anupama starring Anant Nag and Madhavi.

Death
He died from COVID-19 on 5 May 2021.

Films
Anupama (1981)  
Kaviratna Kalidasa (1983)
Shabash Vikram (1985)
Satkara (1986)
Namma Ooru Devathe (1986)
Anjada Gandu (1988)
Kindari Jogi (1989)
Sabarimala Sree Ayyappa (1990)
Bharjari Gandu (1992)
Prutviraj (1992)
Hatamari Hennu Kiladi Gandu (1992)
Kollura Sri Mookambika (1993)
 Professor (1995)
Mahasadhvi Mallamma (2005)

References

External links
 

1939 births
2021 deaths
Indian film directors
Kannada film directors
20th-century Indian film directors
21st-century Indian film directors
Deaths from the COVID-19 pandemic in India